Marco Pascolo (born 9 May 1966) is a Swiss former professional footballer who played as a goalkeeper. He spent his best playing days at Servette FC and FC Zürich in the 1990s and early 2000s (decade). Between 1992 and 2001, he made 55 appearances for the Switzerland national team. He is currently goalkeeping coach for FC Sion.

Career
Born in Sion, Pascolo started playing football professionally in 1986, with local club FC Sion. At Sion, he failed to break into the first-team and left for Neuchâtel Xamax in 1989. During his first season at Xamax, he was used in a squad rotation system, only playing once every few weeks, but in his second season he hit top form and claimed the Number 1 jersey for himself. He signed for Servette FC in 1991 and became a fan favourite almost immediately. Shortly after signing for Servette, he earned a call-up to the Swiss national team. After achieving all he could at Servette, he went to Serie A with Cagliari Calcio in 1996, but found first-team action hard to come by. And after just one season in Italy, he left for England's Nottingham Forrest. He played even fewer games there and returned to Switzerland in 1998 with FC Zürich. He was a first-team regular in Zürich for four seasons before he returned to Servette in 2002 to finish his career.

He was capped 55 times for the Swiss national team between 1992 and 2001. He was in the Swiss squad at the 1994 FIFA World Cup, playing all four games, and also at Euro 1996.

He is now a goalkeeping coach at FC Sion.

Career statistics

Honours
Neuchâtel Xamax
Swiss Super Cup: 1990

FC Zürich
Swiss Cup: 1999–2000

References

External links

1966 births
Living people
People from Sion, Switzerland
Swiss men's footballers
Association football goalkeepers
Switzerland international footballers
Swiss Super League players
English Football League players
Serie A players
FC Sion players
Neuchâtel Xamax FCS players
Servette FC players
Cagliari Calcio players
Nottingham Forest F.C. players
FC Zürich players
1994 FIFA World Cup players
UEFA Euro 1996 players
Swiss people of Italian descent
Swiss expatriate footballers
Swiss expatriate sportspeople in England
Swiss expatriate sportspeople in Italy
Expatriate footballers in England
Expatriate footballers in Italy
Sportspeople from Valais